The Dohány Street Synagogue (Bet ha-Knesset ha-Gadol shel Budapesht), also known as the Great Synagogue or Tabakgasse Synagogue, is a historical building in Erzsébetváros, the 7th district of Budapest, Hungary. It is the largest synagogue in Europe, seating 3,000 people and is a centre of Neolog Judaism.

The synagogue was built between 1854 and 1859 in the Moorish Revival style, with the decoration based chiefly on Islamic models from North Africa and medieval Spain (the Alhambra). The synagogue's Viennese architect, Ludwig Förster, believed that no distinctively Jewish architecture could be identified, and thus chose "architectural forms that have been used by oriental ethnic groups that are related to the Israelite people, and in particular the Arabs". The interior design is partly by Frigyes Feszl.

The Dohány Street Synagogue complex consists of the Great Synagogue, the Heroes' Temple, the graveyard, the Memorial, and the Jewish Museum, which was built on the site on which Theodor Herzl's house of birth stood. Dohány Street itself, a leafy street in the city center, carries strong Holocaust connotations as it constituted the border of the Budapest Ghetto.

History
Built in a residential area between 1854 and 1859 by the Jewish community of Pest according to the plans of Ludwig Förster, the monumental synagogue has a capacity of 2,964 seats (1,492 for men and 1,472 in the women's galleries), making it the largest in Europe and one of the largest working synagogues in the world (after the Beit Midrash of Ger in Jerusalem, the Belz Great Synagogue and Temple Emanu-el in New York City). The consecration of the synagogue took place on 6 September 1859.

The synagogue was bombed by the Hungarian pro-Nazi Arrow Cross Party on 3 February 1939. Used as a base for German Radio and also as a stable during World War II, the building suffered some severe damage from aerial raids during the Nazi Occupation but especially during the Siege of Budapest. During the Communist era, the damaged structure became again a prayer house for the much-diminished Jewish community. Its restoration and renovation started in 1991, financed by the state and by private donations, and was completed in 1998 (see below).

Architecture

Exterior
The style of the Dohány Street Synagogue is Moorish but its design also features a mixture of Byzantine, Romantic and Gothic elements. Two onion domes sit on the twin octagonal towers at  height. A rose stained-glass window sits over the main entrance.

Similarly to basilicas, the building consists of three spacious richly decorated aisles, two balconies and, unusually, an organ. Its ark contains various Torah scrolls taken from other synagogues destroyed during the Holocaust.

The Central Synagogue in Manhattan, New York City is a near-exact copy of the Dohány Street Synagogue.

Interior
The Torah ark and the internal frescoes made of colored and golden geometric shapes are the works of the famous Hungarian romantic architect Frigyes Feszl. A single-span cast iron supports the  nave. The seats on the ground-floor are for men, while the upper gallery, supported by steel ornamented poles, has seats for women. This synagogue is very different from other synagogues as it is the only one to have pipe organs and a cemetery.

Franz Liszt and Camille Saint-Saëns played the original 5,000-pipe organ built in 1859. A new mechanical organ with 63 voices and four manuals was built in 1996 by the German firm Jehmlich Orgelbau Dresden GmbH. One of the most important concerts in the Synagogue's history was in 2002, by the organ virtuoso Xaver Varnus. A crowd of 7,200 filled sanctuary seats and standing space some four hours before the concert to hear the artist's virtuosity.

Renovation
It was only in the 1990s, following the return to democracy in Hungary, that renovations could begin. The three-year program of reconstruction was initially funded by a US$5 million donation from the Hungarian government. Jewish Americans Estée Lauder and Tony Curtis contributed to the additional $20 million needed to complete the restoration in 1996.

Synagogue complex

Hungarian Jewish Museum and Archives

The Hungarian Jewish Museum was constructed on the plot where Theodor Herzl's two-story Classicist style house stood, adjoining the Dohány synagogue. The Jewish Museum was built in 1930 in accordance with the synagogue's architectural style and attached in 1931 to the main building. It holds the Jewish Religious and Historical Collection, a collection of religious relics of the Pest Hevrah Kaddishah (Jewish Burial Society), ritual objects of Shabbat and the High Holidays and a Holocaust room.

Heroes' Temple
The arcade and the Heroes' Temple, which seats 250 people and is used for religious services on weekdays and during the winter time, was added to the Dohány Street Synagogue complex in 1931. The Heroes' Temple was designed by Lázlo Vágó and Ferenc Faragó and serves as a memorial to Hungarian Jews who gave their lives during World War I.

Jewish Cemetery
 

In 1944, the Dohány Street Synagogue was part of the Jewish ghetto for the city Jews and served as shelter for many hundreds. Over two thousand of those who died in the ghetto from hunger and cold during the winter 1944-1945 are buried in the courtyard of the synagogue.

It is not customary to have a cemetery next to a synagogue (as Torah specifies that decedents are to be buried outside of city limits), and the establishment of the 3,000 m2 cemetery was only the result of historical circumstances. In 1944, as a part of the Eichmann-plan, 70,000 Jews were relocated to the ghetto of Pest. Until 18 January 1945, when the Russians liberated the ghetto, around 8,000 to 10,000 people had died, although, one part of the deceased were transferred to the Kozma Street Cemetery, but 2,000 people were buried in the makeshift cemetery. In memory of those who had died, there is a memorial by the sculptor, Imre Varga, depicting a weeping willow with the names and tattoo numbers of the dead and disappeared just behind the Synagogue, in the Raoul Wallenberg Holocaust Memorial Park.

Raoul Wallenberg Holocaust Memorial Park
The Raoul Wallenberg Emlékpark (memory park) in the rear courtyard holds the Memorial of the Hungarian Jewish Martyrs — at least 400,000 Hungarian Jews were murdered by the Nazis. Made by Imre Varga, it resembles a weeping willow whose leaves bear inscriptions with the names of victims. There is also a memorial to Wallenberg and other Righteous Among the Nations, among them: Swiss Vice-consul Carl Lutz; Giorgio Perlasca, an Italian man who, with a strategic escamotage, declared himself the Spanish consul, releasing documents of protection and current passports to Jews in Budapest without distinction (he saved five thousand); Mons. Angelo Rotta, an Italian Prelate Bishop and Apostolic Nuncio of the State of Vatican City in Budapest, which issued protective sheets, misrepresentations of baptism (to save them from forced labor) and Vatican passports to Jews, without distinction of any kind present in Budapest (saving fifteen thousand), who saved, with his secretary Mons. Gennaro Verolino tens of thousands of Hungarian Jews during World War II. Carlos de Liz-Texeira Branquinho a Portuguese diplomat, serving as Portugal's Chargé d'Affaires in Budapest in 1944, issued protective Passports to hundreds of Jewish families, altogether about 1,000 lives were saved due to his actions. Carlos Sampaio Garrido the Portuguese Ambassador who resisted the Hungarian political police when the police raided his home arresting his guests. The Ambassador physically resisted the police and was also arrested but managed to have his guests released by invoking the extraterritorial legal rights of diplomatic legations; five of the guests were members of the famous Gabor family.

Trivia
Dohány means tobacco in Hungarian, a loan word from Ottoman Turkish دخان (duhân), itself borrowed from Arabic  (duḫḫān). A similar Turkish loanword for tobacco is used throughout the Balkans (e.g., duhan in Bosnian).

Theodor Herzl in his speeches and the Jewish Encyclopedia referred to the Dohány Street Synagogue as the Tabakgasse Synagogue. The Dohány Street Synagogue is also known under the name of the Tabak-Shul, the Yiddish translation of Dohány Synagogue.

Antisemitic attacks
On 23 October 2012, an Israeli flag was burned in front of a Budapest synagogue, reportedly by members of Jobbik, an ultranationalist Hungarian political party.

See also
Újpest Synagogue

Notes and references

Sources

External links

Dohany Street Great Synagogue Official Website
A performance in the Great Synagogue of the music from the film Schindler's List, with Csongor Korossy-Khayll (violin) & Xaver Varnus (organ).
Dohány Street Synagogue in the Bezalel Narkiss Index of Jewish Art, Center for Jewish Art, Hebrew University of Jerusalem

Synagogues in Budapest
Neolog Judaism synagogues
Moorish Revival synagogues
Erzsébetváros
Synagogues completed in 1859
Synagogue buildings with domes
Landmarks in Hungary
21st-century attacks on synagogues and Jewish communal organizations